Operation Phoenix was a post-World War II rehabilitation program carried out by the Victorian Railways (VR) in Australia. The program commenced in 1950 and was originally planned to take 10 years and cost £80 million pounds. Operation Phoenix was named after the bird from Egyptian mythology.

Background
The Victorian Railways of the 1930s and 1940s had become run down, with years of economic depression, the war effort, and material shortages resulting in a general decline. At the time it was expected that a railway the size of VR should have been building 25 locomotives, 30 to 40 carriages, and 500 wagons per year, as well as relaying 60 miles of track. In reality VR were only able to build an average of 4 locomotives and 200 wagons per year, and these gains had been counteracted by long overdue scrappings.

When World War II hit, the VR had no chance to rebuild, with resources being directed towards the war effort, only patch up work and essential maintenance was possible. Furthermore, passenger travel had been restricted by government, then cut even further due to fuel shortages, with trains taking longer and buffet carriages removed. Despite this, in 1948-49 country passenger business was up 76 percent on that of 1938–39, which were considered the best pre war years, and suburban traffic was up 22 percent. In addition, goods traffic was up by 53 percent, with more goods being handled than any of the war years.

After the end of the war, rebuilding work began in a small way, with new steel, air-conditioned carriages built, as well as new sleeping-cars for The Overland. However, the growth in patronage was due to a lack of alternate transport, with wartime petrol rationing still in force. Passengers were unimpressed with the service provided, and were looking for someone to blame. In 1949 a review of the Victorian Railways was commissioned by transport minister Kent Hughes, and was carried out by British Railways Chief Executive John Elliot. The report found much to admire in the management and staff, but criticised the run-down locomotives, rolling stock, and track and predicted a "final breakdown of rail transport" in ten years if nothing was done. The ideas of the report were not new, the Victorian Railways had been making plans for modernisation of their operations, but did not have the money or political will to implement them.

Works

Operation Phoenix was conceived to address these issues, and took 18 months of planning before it was publicly released. As a whole the program would cost £83 million, with £40 million to be spent on rolling stock, including:
 350 steam and diesel locomotives
 30 railcars
 290 steel passenger cars
 280 suburban passenger carriages
 9000 goods wagons
 300 goods vans

Capital works took up the other £43 million, and were planned to cover:

 An underground railway between a new Richmond station and North Melbourne via the north of the Melbourne CBD (not realised until the City Loop of the 1980s)
 track modernisation, rebuilding, regrading and duplication of existing lines
 replacement of timber bridges to permit heavier trains
 modernisation of locomotives depots and workshops
 reconstruction and expending Melbourne Yard and associated goods sheds

Initial projects included:
 100 steam locomotives
 17 diesel electric locomotives
 10 diesel electric shunting locomotives
 30 self-propelled railcars
 1000 goods wagons
 Electrification, regrading and duplication of the main Gippsland line from Dandenong to Traralgon, to cope with demand for Morwell brown coal and to reduce the dependence on New South Wales coal.
 importation of electric locos
 new substations on the suburban railway lines

To ensure the earliest possible delivery, the construction of the steam locomotives, railcars, and half of the wagons was contracted to British firms, with 18 of the railcars had already been completed by 1950. The major components for the mainline diesel electric locomotives were to be imported from the United States, dependent on the allocation of foreign exchange funds from the federal government.

The remainder of the new rolling stock was constructed by the VR's own workshops, including 20 of the "N class" steam engines, 14 new air-conditioned passenger cars, and 2 new suburban trains.

Funding difficulties

After the 1951-52 financial year, the Victorian Railways were almost £6 million pounds in deficit. Freight rates and passenger fares were increased, but the VR still did not expect to make ends meet. The program of works for 1952-53 was intended to be £12.5 million, and was intended to cover the duplication of the Alamein line between Camberwell and Ashburton, track amplification between Flinders Street and South Yarra, a new Richmond station, importation of 1500 precut houses from England for railway staff, and the purchase of equipment for the use of pulverised brown coal in steam locomotives.

However loans became difficult to negotiate due to money market issues, and so the budget for Operation Phoenix was cut back to £6.8 million. Capital works were slowed, with the loss of employment for many men, and hundreds of thousands of pounds of material were held in storage. Works on the Gippsland electrification was to be completed to Warragul station by 1953, but due to the funding cuts the time line was revised to 1954. 500 of the precut houses were cancelled, the Victorian contribution to joint carriage stock for use on The Overland was cut to 6 sitting cars, and work at Newport Workshops building locomotives, carriages and livestock trucks was suspended. Outside rolling stock contractors were also told to slow down, and to defer claims for progress payments until the 1953-54 financial year.

By June 1952 the rolling stock situation was:
 All 50 of the N class steam locomotive order in service
 64 of the 70 strong R class steam locomotive order in service
 60 J class steam locomotives on order
 10 F class diesel shunting locomotives delivered
 26 B class main line diesels on order
 25 L class electrics on order
 All 30 of the Walker railcars in service
 DERM fleet refurbished
 137 goods wagons built by the VR workshops
 1825 open wagons built by outside contractors

By the end of that year five of the B class diesels and five more R classes were in service.

Outcomes 

By 1953 the new mainline diesels were running  a week, four times as far as the best steam locomotives. An hour had been cut from long-distance passenger trains to Adelaide, Bairnsdale, Warrnambool, Mildura, and others were also sped up with the delivery of further locomotives. Electrification of the Gippsland line was completed to Warragul in 1954 and to Traralgon in 1956 at a total cost of £6.3 million, but electrification did not spread to the other country railways as originally intended by Operation Phoenix, as the new diesel locomotives were more cost effective than the electrics. Dieselisation of the Victorian Railways continued, with the T class branchline locomotives delivered from 1955. Operation Phoenix was also the peak of capital spending on the Victorian railways, the expenditure during 1950-51 was not exceeded until 1984–85.

See also
 Rail transport in Victoria
 Ashworth Improvement Plan
 1969 Melbourne Transportation Plan
 Lonie Report
 Bland Report
 New Deal
 Regional Fast Rail project

References

Rail transport in Victoria (Australia)